"Til You Can't" is a song by American country music singer Cody Johnson. It was released on October 18, 2021, as the lead single from his eighth studio album Human: The Double Album. The song was written by Ben Stennis and Matt Rogers, and produced by Trent Willmon.

The song won Single of the Year at the Country Music Association Awards in 2022.

Content
In a press release, Johnson stated that the song conveys a message of "optimism and focus on perseverance," saying: "In our world today, we could use more positivity."

Music video
The music video was released on October 15, 2021. It includes scenes of "fishing excursions, classic-car rebuilding sessions, family dinners" interspersed with footage of "Johnson delivering a fiery solo performance of the song". Johnson said: "I love the story line in the video. You think it's going in one direction and then suddenly you are surprised at the turn of events. When they sent me the rough edit of the video it was so powerful and brought tears to my eyes. It put into perspective the song that I had been singing for months."

The video also won Video of the Year at the Country Music Association Awards in 2022.

Commercial performance
Til You Can't" debuted at number 42 on the Billboard Hot Country Songs chart dated June 26, 2021. After the album was released, it climbed to number 24 on the chart dated October 23, 2021.

Charts

Weekly charts

Year-end charts

Certifications

Release history

References

2021 singles
2021 songs
Cody Johnson songs
Songs written by Ben Stennis
Warner Records Nashville singles